Miranha is a genus of cicadas in the family Cicadidae. There is at least one described species in Miranha, M. imbellis.

References

Further reading

 
 
 
 
 
 

Zammarini
Cicadidae genera